Abacetus trechoides is a species of ground beetle in the subfamily Pterostichinae. It was described by Peringuey in 1896.

References

trechoides
Beetles described in 1896